Caravonica is a suburb of Cairns in the Cairns Region, Queensland, Australia.

Geography
Caravonica lies in the foothills of the Queensland tropical rain forests. The boundary of the suburb can be found as far north as the Tjapukai Aboriginal Cultural Park and the Skyrail Rainforest Cableway's southern terminal is known as the Caravonica Terminal. The southern border is bounded by Kamerunga, aligning with the Barron River riparian zone along the Kamerunga section of the northern bank of the river.

Lake Placid is a neighbourhood within the locality. Formerly known as Barron Waters, it is named after a natural pond in the Barron River, created by a rock barrage. Lake Placid is the entrance to the Barron Gorge National Park.

A supplementary section of Lake Placid Road leads to Kamerunga Conservation Park and Kamerunga Crossing, a ford across the Barron River. It is the location of an old bridge (no longer for use by vehicles).

Maps

History
Caravonica is situated in the Djabugay (Tjapukai) traditional Aboriginal country. The Yirrganydji people are custodians within the Djabugay traditional country

The origin of the suburb name is from the town of Caravonica in Italy, named in the 1880s after the hometown of David Thomatis.

Caravonica was originally part of the Shire of Mulgrave and then the City of Cairns local government areas.

Kamerunga State School opened on 28 May 1913. It was wrecked in a cyclone in February 1927. On 6 April 1927 it reopened at a new location as Caravonica State School. The decision to relocate the school had been taken prior to the cyclone.

Lake Placid was originally called Barron Waters but was renamed in 1969. It is named after a natural pond in the Barron River, created by a rock barrage. 

Community groups 
The Smithfield branch of the Queensland Country Women's Association meets at the CWA Hall on Kamerunga Road, Caravonica. It is between the Caravonica State School and the Australian Armour and Artillery Museum.

Images

References

External links

Tjapukai Aboriginal Cultural Park

Suburbs of Cairns